"Natural" is a song by English pop group S Club 7. It was released on 11 September 2000 as the second single from their second studio album 7 (2000). The track was written by Norma Ray, Jean Fredenucci, Cathy Dennis, and Andrew Todd. It is an English cover of Ray's 1999 hit "Tous les maux d'amour", both of which sample Gabriel Fauré's Pavane. Upon the song's release, it peaked at number three in the United Kingdom and reached the top 50 in Australia, Germany, and Ireland.

Song information

"Natural", S Club 7's fifth single, features Rachel Stevens on lead vocals. It describes love for an individual as a natural occurrence. There are three different versions of the song. The album version, included on the original release of 7, features a R&B style production. The single version is mixed with heavier pop music themes, including the use of a vocoder, and the male vocals are more predominant. The video version is identical to the single version, except it features extra adlib vocals from Rachel.

Music video

The official music video, directed by Andy Morahan, features the group on a tropical beach. The video progresses to show the men fish in the water as the women observe from the beach while sunbathing. The video was filmed and directed in Malibu.

Track listings

UK CD1
 "Natural" (single version) – 3:14
 "Natural" (Crash & Burn mix) – 5:56
 "Natural" (Full Crew mix) – 3:40
 "Natural" (CD-ROM)

UK CD2
 "Natural" (single version) – 3:14
 "If It's Love" – 4:08
 "You're My Number One" (Almighty mix) – 10:44
 Picture gallery (CD-ROM)

UK cassette single
 "Natural" (single version) – 3:14
 "If It's Love" – 4:08

US CD single
 "Natural" (Spike mix)
 7 album snippets

French CD single
 "Natural" (Route 66 Slow n'Low mix) – 3:54
 "Natural" (Full Crew mix edit) – 3:38
 "Natural" (single version) – 3:14

Australian CD1
 "Natural" (single version) – 3:14
 "Natural" (Crash & Burn mix) – 5:58
 "Natural" (Full Crew mix edit) – 3:40
 "Spiritual Love" – 3:51
 "Natural" (CD-ROM enhanced video)

Australian CD2
 "Natural" (single version) – 3:14
 "If It's Love" – 4:08
 "You're My Number One" (Almighty mix) – 10:44
 "Stand by You" – 3:03
 "Picture gallery (CD-ROM)

Credits and personnel
Credits are lifted from the UK CD1 liner notes and the 7 album booklet.

Studio
 Mastered at Transfermation (London, England)

Personnel

 Norma Ray – writing ("Tous les maux d'amour")
 Jean Fredenucci – writing ("Tous les maux d'amour")
 Cathy Dennis – writing, keyboards, production
 Andrew Todd – writing
 Gus Isidore – guitars
 Yak Bondy – keyboards, drums, programming
 Kate St John – cor anglais
 Absolute – all other instruments, co-production
 Phil Bodger – production
 Dave Way – additional production, mixing
 Mark "Spike" Stent – mixing (single version)
 Jan "Stan" Kybert – mixing assistant and Pro Tools (single version)
 Aaron Pratley – mix engineering (single version)
 Thom Russo – editing
 Noel Summerville – mastering
 Richard Dowling – mastering

Charts

Release history

References

2000 singles
2000 songs
Interscope Records singles
Music videos directed by Andy Morahan
Polydor Records singles
S Club 7 songs
Song recordings produced by Absolute (production team)
Song recordings produced by Cathy Dennis
Songs written by Cathy Dennis